The Main Directorate for Migration Affairs of the Ministry of Internal Affairs of the Russian Federation (GUVM) is a law enforcement agency of the Ministry of Internal Affairs of Russia responsible for migration. 

Migration Affairs is the authority for the enforcement of migration laws in Russia, drafting and implementing national policy, and providing government services with regard to migration. Migration Affairs issues Russian international passports, resident registration and immigration control, and is charged with the investigation and enforcement of over 500 federal statutes within the Russian Federation. 

Migration Affairs was established on 5 April 2016 when the Federal Migration Service was dissolved and its functions were transferred to the Ministry of Internal Affairs. It is led by a police colonel who is appointed by the Minister of Internal Affairs. Valentina Kazakova has been Director of Migration Affairs since 8 February 2019. Migration Affairs is headquartered at Zhitnaya Street 16 in Yakimanka, Moscow.

See also
Police of Russia
Militsiya

References

External links
Official Homepage

Government agencies established in 2016
Specialist law enforcement agencies of Russia